Sageretia gracilis is a shrub with slightly shiny dark green leaves and yellow-green flowers. It grows in thickets or forests in valleys and on mountains around 1200 to 3400 meters of W Guangxi, east and south east Xizang, and Yunnan, China.

References
RHAMNACEAE

gracilis
Flora of China